Holmdel Township is a township in Monmouth County, in the U.S. state of New Jersey. The township is centrally located in the Raritan Valley region, being within the regional and cultural influence of the Raritan Bayshore. It is located in the New York Metropolitan Area and is a major bedroom community of New York City.

As of the 2020 United States census, the township's population was 17,400, an increase of 627 (+3.7%) from the 2010 census count of 16,773, which in turn reflected an increase of 992 (+6.3%) from the 15,781 counted in the 2000 census.

Holmdel Township was formed by an act of the New Jersey Legislature on February 23, 1857, from portions of Raritan Township (now Hazlet).

The township is notable, among other things, for its historical and present connection to Bell Labs. Important evidence for the Big Bang was discovered at a Bell Labs facility in Holmdel by Arno Penzias and Robert Wilson, both of whom won the Nobel Prize in Physics for their work here. In addition, former Secretary of Energy Steven Chu earned a Nobel Prize in Physics for his work on laser cooling in Holmdel.

Holmdel's picturesque beauty, proximity to New York and main highways, award-winning public schools, large homes, rich history, the PNC Bank Arts Center, and the presence of many high paying jobs within commuting distance led the township to be ranked the #1 "Six-Figure Town" by Money magazine and CNN for 2009.

The township has been one of the state's highest-income communities. Based on data from the American Community Survey (ACS) for 2013–2017, Holmdel Township residents had a median household income of $155,842, ranked 10th in the state among municipalities with more than 10,000 residents, more than double the statewide median of $76,475. Based on data from the 2006–2010 ACS, Holmdel had a per-capita income of $62,120, ranked 46th in the state.

History

The earliest work on radio astronomy was conducted by Bell Labs engineer Karl Guthe Jansky in 1931 in Holmdel. In 1964, Arno Penzias and Robert Woodrow Wilson of Bell Labs discovered evidence for cosmic microwave background radiation while performing research with the Holmdel Horn Antenna, earning them the Nobel Prize in Physics.

The PNC Bank Arts Center is a 10,800-seat outdoor amphitheatre concert venue located in Holmdel. PNC Financial Services agreed to a deal in 1996 under which it would pay $9.2 million for the naming rights, as part an effort by the Parkway Authority to avoid toll increases, a deal that was extended for another five years in 2006. The facility, which originally opened in 1968, was commissioned by the Garden State Parkway Authority and built based on a design by architect Edward Durell Stone at a cost of $6.75 million (equivalent to $ million in ). Adjacent to it is the New Jersey Vietnam Veterans Memorial, which opened on May 7, 1995.

In 1977, Bruce Springsteen wrote and recorded many of his songs from his album Darkness on the Edge of Town in an old farmhouse in Holmdel.

VoIP provider Vonage Holdings, Inc., relocated its world headquarters from Edison to Holmdel in November 2005, occupying the building that formerly housed Prudential Property Casualty & Insurance.

Geography

According to the United States Census Bureau, the township had a total area of 18.05 square miles (46.75 km2), including 17.85 square miles (46.22 km2) of land and 0.20 square miles (0.53 km2) of water (1.13%).

The top portion of the hill is owned by Alcatel-Lucent and houses a research laboratory of Bell Laboratories.

The township borders the Monmouth County communities of Aberdeen Township, Colts Neck Township, Hazlet Township, Marlboro Township and Middletown Township.

Unincorporated communities, localities and place names located partially or completely within the township include: Beers, Centerville, Crawford Corners, Everett, Morrells Corner and Pleasant Valley Crossroads.

Demographics

In 2009, the average annual family income was $159,633, making it one of the highest in the country.

2010 census

The Census Bureau's 2006–2010 American Community Survey showed that (in 2010 inflation-adjusted dollars) median household income was $140,533 (with a margin of error of +/− $18,587) and the median family income was $154,360 (+/− $13,795). Males had a median income of $135,139 (+/− $15,633) versus $77,703 (+/− $13,861) for females. The per capita income for the township was $62,120 (+/− $6,232). About 3.0% of families and 3.8% of the population were below the poverty line, including 4.0% of those under age 18 and 1.0% of those age 65 or over.

2000 census
As of the 2000 United States census there were 15,781 people, 4,948 households, and 4,328 families residing in the township.  The population density was 878.4 people per square mile (339.1/km2). There were 5,137 housing units at an average density of 285.9 per square mile (110.4/km2). The racial makeup of the township was 80.20% White, 17.45% Asian, 0.65% African American, 0.03% Native American, 0.01% Pacific Islander, 0.52% from other races, and 1.15% from two or more races. Hispanic or Latino of any race were 2.45% of the population.

As of the 2000 Census, 9.97% of Holmdel Township's residents identified themselves as being of Chinese ancestry. This was the highest percentage of people with Chinese ancestry in any place in New Jersey with 1,000 or more residents identifying their ancestry.

There were 4,947 households, out of which 47.1% had children under the age of 18 living with them, 79.1% were married couples living together, 6.7% had a female householder with no husband present, and 12.5% were non-families. 11.1% of all households were made up of individuals, and 4.3% had someone living alone who was 65 years of age or older.  The average household size was 3.09 and the average family size was 3.35.

In the township the age distribution of the population shows 28.5% under the age of 18, 5.2% from 18 to 24, 24.8% from 25 to 44, 29.2% from 45 to 64, and 12.2% who were 65 years of age or older.  The median age was 41 years. For every 100 females, there were 91.9 males.  For every 100 females age 18 and over, there were 86.6 males.

According to the 2000 Census, the median income for a household in the township was $112,879, and the median income for a family was $122,785. Males had a median income of $94,825 versus $54,625 for females. The per capita income for the township was $47,898.  About 2.7% of families and 3.4% of the population were below the poverty line, including 4.0% of those under age 18 and 6.7% of those age 65 or over.

Arts and culture
Musical groups from Holmdel Township include Granian, a band formed by musician Garen Guyikian.

Parks and recreation

The park also has the Holmdel Arboretum (formally the David C. Shaw Arboretum), covering  and established in 1963, which offers examples of the trees, shrubs and plant life of Monmouth County.

Government

Local government 
Holmdel Township is governed under the Township form of New Jersey municipal government, one of 141 municipalities (of the 564) statewide that use this form, the second-most commonly used form of government in the state. The Township Committee is comprised of five members, who are elected directly by the voters at-large in partisan elections to serve three-year terms of office on a staggered basis, with either one or two seats coming up for election each year as part of the November general election in a three-year cycle. At an annual reorganization meeting, the Township Committee selects one of its members to serve as Mayor and another as Deputy Mayor. The Township Committee exercises control over the conduct of municipal business by means of legislation through ordinances or resolutions, approval and adoption of the annual budget and the formulation of policy to be carried out by the staff.

, members of the Holmdel Township Council are Mayor Gregory Buontempo (R, term on committee ends December 31, 2023; term as mayor ends 2022), Deputy Mayor Prakash Santhana (I, term on committee and as deputy mayor ends 2022), Rocco Impreveduto (R, 2024), Domenico "DJ" Luccarelli (R, 2023) and Cathy Weber (I, 2022).

In November 2021, voters approved the establishment of a Charter Study Commission that would review the township's options for changing its form of government and would make recommendations to be considered by the public. In April 2022, the commission recommended that the township adopt the Council-Manager form of government available under the Faulkner Act, in which the main change from the current government would be that day-to-day operation of the township would be in the hands of a professional administrator.

In the November 2019 general election, a recount put two independent candidates in office, with Prakash Santhana winning the second of the two seats by a margin of two votes over the Republican candidate.

Deputy Mayor Serena DiMaso left office in January 2012 to fill the vacant seat of Robert D. Clifton on the Monmouth County Board of Chosen Freeholders. Joseph Ponisi was selected to fill Dimaso's vacant seat and took office in January 2012, then was elected to the remainder of her term in the November 2012 general election.

Federal, state, and county representation 
Holmdel Township is located in the 3rd Congressional District and is part of New Jersey's 13th state legislative district. 

 

Monmouth County is governed by a Board of County Commissioners comprised of five members who are elected at-large to serve three year terms of office on a staggered basis, with either one or two seats up for election each year as part of the November general election. At an annual reorganization meeting held in the beginning of January, the board selects one of its members to serve as Director and another as Deputy Director. , Monmouth County's Commissioners are
Commissioner Director Thomas A. Arnone (R, Neptune City, term as commissioner and as director ends December 31, 2022), 
Commissioner Deputy Director Susan M. Kiley (R, Hazlet Township, term as commissioner ends December 31, 2024; term as deputy commissioner director ends 2022),
Lillian G. Burry (R, Colts Neck Township, 2023),
Nick DiRocco (R, Wall Township, 2022), and 
Ross F. Licitra (R, Marlboro Township, 2023). 
Constitutional officers elected on a countywide basis are
County clerk Christine Giordano Hanlon (R, 2025; Ocean Township), 
Sheriff Shaun Golden (R, 2022; Howell Township) and 
Surrogate Rosemarie D. Peters (R, 2026; Middletown Township).

Politics
As of March 2011, there were a total of 12,021 registered voters in Holmdel Township, of which 1,965 (16.3%) were registered as Democrats, 4,110 (34.2%) were registered as Republicans and 5,946 (49.5%) were registered as Unaffiliated. There were no voters registered to other parties.

In the 2012 presidential election, Republican Mitt Romney received 61.8% of the vote (5,077 cast), ahead of Democrat Barack Obama with 37.3% (3,063 votes), and other candidates with 0.9% (75 votes), among the 8,261 ballots cast by the township's 12,425 registered voters (46 ballots were spoiled), for a turnout of 66.5%. In the 2008 presidential election, Republican John McCain received 58.6% of the vote (5,403 cast), ahead of Democrat Barack Obama with 39.2% (3,616 votes) and other candidates with 0.9% (82 votes), among the 9,225 ballots cast by the township's 12,679 registered voters, for a turnout of 72.8%. In the 2004 presidential election, Republican George W. Bush received 61.9% of the vote (5,522 ballots cast), outpolling Democrat John Kerry with 37.1% (3,308 votes) and other candidates with 0.5% (56 votes), among the 8,915 ballots cast by the township's 11,892 registered voters, for a turnout percentage of 75.0.

In the 2013 gubernatorial election, Republican Chris Christie received 77.3% of the vote (3,587 cast), ahead of Democrat Barbara Buono with 21.4% (993 votes), and other candidates with 1.3% (58 votes), among the 4,712 ballots cast by the township's 12,312 registered voters (74 ballots were spoiled), for a turnout of 38.3%. In the 2009 gubernatorial election, Republican Chris Christie received 67.8% of the vote (4,182 ballots cast), ahead of Democrat Jon Corzine with 25.8% (1,590 votes), Independent Chris Daggett with 5.2% (318 votes) and other candidates with 0.7% (46 votes), among the 6,170 ballots cast by the township's 12,315 registered voters, yielding a 50.1% turnout.

Education
The Holmdel Township Public Schools serve students in pre-kindergarten through twelfth grade. As of the 2018–19 school year, the district, comprised of four schools, had an enrollment of 2,997 students and 263.6 classroom teachers (on an FTE basis), for a student–teacher ratio of 11.4:1. Schools in the district (with 2018–19 enrollment data from the National Center for Education Statistics) are 
Village Elementary School with 759 students in grades Pre-K–3, 
Indian Hill School with 752 students in grades 4–6, 
William R. Satz School with 521 students in grades 7–8 and 
Holmdel High School with 962 students in grades 9–12.

The Holmdel public schools start middle school at 7th grade instead of the usual starting middle school at 6th grade (Wr-Satz).

Holmdel High School was the 12th-ranked public high school in New Jersey out of 339 schools statewide in New Jersey Monthly magazine's September 2012 cover story on the state's "Top Public High Schools", after being ranked 13th in 2012 out of 328 schools listed. The high school was ranked 20th in the state of New Jersey and number 723 overall by The Washington Post in its 2011 ranking of American high schools.

Holmdel High School became the center of a scandal due to a hazing incident at a football camp in 1988 that was reported in the press and received considerable notoriety.

Private schools within the township include the Roman Catholic Diocese of Trenton's St. John Vianney High School for grades 9–12 and St. Benedict School, a kindergarten through eighth grade Catholic school that feeds into St. John Vianney. Holmdel was home to the now-defunct New School High School of Monmouth County, an alternative school based on the British Integrated Method, in which students in grades K–8 spend three years in a "family" that covers three grades in a traditional school program.

Infrastructure

Public Safety
Formally established in 1966, the Holmdel Township Police Department traces its origins to a part-time constable hired in 1947 who was named as the first police chief in 1952.

Holmdel Fire and Rescue Company # 2 is an all-volunteer department created in 2006 that serves Holmdel and surrounding areas.

Holmdel First Aid Squad is an all-volunteer organization that responds to medical emergencies in the township. Founded in 1969, the squad responds to an average of 1,500 calls each year, with no charge for medical services or transportation.

Transportation

Roads and highways

A few major roads pass through the township. The Garden State Parkway passes through near the center with part of Exit 114 (the other half in Middletown Township) and Exit 116 (for the PNC Bank Arts Center) in Holmdel. Route 34 passes through the western part while Route 35 goes through in the northern section. Major county routes that cross through include a short stretch of CR 516 in the north and CR 520 in the south.

Public transportation
NJ Transit and Academy Bus provide service in the area.

The nearest train stops to the township are located at Aberdeen-Matawan, Hazlet, and Middletown, all along the NJ Transit's North Jersey Coast Line to Hoboken Terminal, Newark's Penn Station, and New York's Penn Station.

Ferry service is available through the Seastreak service in nearby Highlands, about a 15-20 minute drive from Holmdel Township. SeaStreak offers ferry service to New York City with trips to Pier 11 (on the East River at Wall Street) and East 35th Street in Manhattan. The ferry service also offers seasonal travel, such as to the public beaches on Sandy Hook, baseball games at Yankee Stadium and Citi Field, trips to Broadway matinees, Martha's Vineyard in Massachusetts, college football games at West Point, fall foliage in the Hudson Valley, and to the Macy's Thanksgiving Day Parade, among other excursions.

Healthcare
Bayshore Medical Center is a regional hospital located in the township. Serving the greater Raritan Bayshore region, the hospital is a partner of Hackensack Meridian Health and is affiliated with Rutgers Robert Wood Johnson Medical School. The facility has 169 beds and currently offers cardiac catheterization, diagnostic Imaging, medical/surgical, behavioral health, emergency, laboratory and transitional care. In 2021 it was given a grade A by the Leapfrog patient safety organization. Other regional hospitals near the township include Riverview Medical Center in nearby Red Bank and Raritan Bay Medical Center, with divisions in Perth Amboy and Old Bridge, both hospitals are also part of Hackensack Meridian.

Located in neighboring Middletown is Memorial Sloan Kettering Cancer Center. Originally founded in New York City in 1884, it is the oldest cancer treatment and research center in the world. The Memorial Sloan Kettering Cancer Center of Monmouth County is the first center outside of the main center in Manhattan to offer outpatient surgery.

The closest major university hospitals to the township are located at Jersey Shore University Medical Center in Neptune Township and Robert Wood Johnson University Hospital in New Brunswick.

Notable people

People who were born in, residents of, or otherwise closely associated with Holmdel Township include:

 Henry E. Ackerson Jr. (1880–1970), Justice of the New Jersey Supreme Court from 1948 to 1952
 David F. Bauman, New Jersey Superior Court judge
 John Burke (born 1971), former professional football player, New England Patriots, New York Jets and San Diego Chargers
 John Cannon (born 1960), former defensive end who played nine seasons for the Tampa Bay Buccaneers
 Dominick Casola (born 1987), race car driver who made starts in NASCAR and the ARCA Menards Series from 2006 to 2013 
 Herbert Cohen (born 1940), Olympic fencer
 Sean Davis (born 1993), professional soccer player for the New York Red Bulls of Major League Soccer
 Christopher Dell (born 1956), diplomat who served as U.S. Ambassador to Kosovo, Zimbabwe and Angola
 Serena DiMaso (born 1963), politician who served as mayor of Holmdel Township and has represented the 13th Legislative District in the New Jersey General Assembly 2018-2021
 John J. Ely (1778–1852), member of the New Jersey General Assembly
 S. Thomas Gagliano (1931–2019), politician who served in the New Jersey Senate from 1978 to 1989
 Renzo Gracie (born 1967), professional mixed martial arts fighter from Brazil
 William Barclay Harding (1906–1967), financier who served as chairman of the board of Smith, Barney Co. until his death
 Pete Hegseth (born 1980), Fox News contributor, Bronze Star Medal recipient
 John Henry Heyer (1831–1905), politician
 Jennifer Farley (born 1986), MTV television personality and entrepreneur
 Jodi Kantor (born 1975), reporter for The New York Times and author of The Obamas
 Alisa Kresge (born 1985), former basketball player who is the head coach of the Vermont Catamounts women's basketball team
 Dan Metzger (born 1993), professional soccer player who plays as a midfielder for Memphis 901 FC in the USL Championship
 SallyAnn Mosey, meteorologist
 Quenton Nelson (born 1996), offensive guard for the Indianapolis Colts
 Matt O'Ree (born 1972), blues-rock guitarist, singer and songwriter
 Michael V. Pomarico (born 1955; class of 1974), six-time Emmy Award winner for his work on the ABC-TV daytime drama All My Children
 Tab Ramos (born 1966), retired football midfielder who played on the U.S. Olympic team and was the first player to sign with Major League Soccer, where he played seven years with the MetroStars
 Bob Roggy (1956–1986), athlete who set the American javelin throw record in the early 1980s
 Lorene Scafaria (born 1978), screenwriter, playwright, actress, singer, and director who wrote, co-produced, and directed the 2009 film Hustlers
 John Conover Smock (1842–1926), geologist
 Julie Sokolow (born 1987), lo-fi singer-songwriter, writer, and independent filmmaker
 Michael Sorrentino (born 1982), MTV television personality and entrepreneur
 Anthony Spalliero (1942–2010), real estate developer with organized crime ties
 Bruce Springsteen (born 1949), singer-songwriter
 Felicia Stoler, host of Honey, We're Killing the Kids on The Learning Channel
 John H. Tilelli Jr. (born 1941), retired United States Army four-star general
 John Valentin (born 1967), infielder who played for the Boston Red Sox and New York Mets
 Robert Woodrow Wilson (born 1936), awarded the Nobel Prize in Physics in 1978
 Joe Yeninas (1934–2020), cartoonist and illustrator for the Newark Evening News, the Associated Press and The Journal of Commerce
 Harold A. Zahl (1905–1973), director of research at Camp Evans (later Fort Monmouth), responsible for critical U.S. developments in radar technology during World War II

Points of interest 
 Bell Labs Holmdel Complex – Now occupied by Spirent Communications and Suttons International, the buildings were constructed by architects Eero Saarinen and Sasaki, Walker and Associates from 1957 to 1962.
 Holmes-Hendrickson House – listed on the National Register of Historic Places, the home was constructed by William Holmes in the mid 1750s in the Dutch vernacular style.
 Upper Meeting House of the Baptist Church of Middletown is the state's first Baptist congregation, established in 1688, with its current building constructed in 1809. It is now part of the Holmdel Community Church, after a merger with the Holmdel Dutch Reformed Church, established in 1699 and constructed in 1838.
 Vietnam Era Museum & Educational Center – The Vietnam Era Museum & Educational Center opened in 1998 and is located adjacent to the New Jersey Vietnam Veterans Memorial.
 Kovenhoven (1700) and Old Kentuck (1770) are historic homes dating to the 18th century, which have been added to the National Register of Historic Places.
 Holmdel Cemetery & Mausoleum – This cemetery has been serving Monmouth County residents since 1871. The property spans over 10 acres and includes 6 mausoleums.

References

External links

Holmdel Township's official website
Holmdel Historical Society
Former Holmdel Nike Missile Site

 
1857 establishments in New Jersey
Populated places established in 1857
Township form of New Jersey government
Townships in Monmouth County, New Jersey